Shi Hongjun (born 4 October 1991) is a Chinese footballer who currently plays as a midfielder for Meizhou Kejia.

Club career
Shi Hongjun was summoned to Guangzhou Evergrande's first team in December 2009. On 3 April 2010, he made his senior debut in the first round of 2010 season which Guangzhou Evergrande beat Beijing BIT 3–1, coming on as a substitute for Gabriel Melkam in the 68th minute. His first goal came in his second appearance on 21 July 2010 in a 10–0 home victory against Nanjing Yoyo. He was assisted by Sun Xiang who crossed the ball from the left wing and Shi scored the club's eighth goal of the match. He failed to establish himself within the first team after Guangzhou promoted to the Chinese Super League and was released at the end of 2013 season.

In February 2014，Shi moved to China League Two side Meizhou Kejia. He went on to win the 2015 China League Two division and promotion into the second tier. He would then go on to be a vital member of the team for several seasons, however was dropped to the reserves as the club gained promotion to the top tier after coming second within the division at the end of the 2021 China League One campaign.

Career statistics 
Statistics accurate as of match played 31 December 2021.

Honours

Club
Guangzhou Evergrande
AFC Champions League: 2013
Chinese Super League: 2011, 2012, 2013
China League One: 2010
Chinese FA Super Cup: 2012
Chinese FA Cup: 2012

Meizhou Kejia
China League Two: 2015

References

External links
Player profile at Sodasoccer.com
 

1991 births
Living people
Footballers from Guangzhou
Chinese footballers
Association football midfielders
Guangzhou F.C. players
Meizhou Hakka F.C. players
Chinese Super League players
China League One players
China League Two players
21st-century Chinese people